Astrothelium carrascoense is a species of corticolous (bark-dwelling) lichen in the family Trypetheliaceae. Found in Bolivia, it was formally described as a new species in 2016 by lichenologists Adam Flakus, Martin Kukwa, and André Aptroot. Its species epithet refers to the type locality, the only place it is known to occur. The lichen has large, singly occurring ascomata that are completely covered by the green thallus. Its ascospores are narrowly ellipsoid and slightly curved, measuring 150–210 by 40–50 μm. Astrothelium meristosporum is somewhat similar in appearance, but can be distinguished by its narrower (25–40 μm) ascospores than have a distinct septum in the middle, and the ostioles (pores) of its ascomata.

References

carrascoense
Lichen species
Lichens described in 2016
Lichens of Bolivia
Taxa named by André Aptroot
Taxa named by Adam Grzegorz Flakus